Bhavna Ruparel is an Indian actress who appears in Bollywood and Telugu movies.

Early life and education
She was born in Mumbai India. She is the younger sister of actress Pooja Ruparel and cousin of actress Sonakshi Sinha.

Career
Bhavna Ruparel started appearing in Bollywood movies as a child artist in 2002. She appeared in Na Tum Jaano Na Hum, starring Hrithik Roshan and Saif Ali Khan. Bhavna made her acting debut as lead actress with the movie Chal Pichchur Banate Hain in the year 2012. She appeared as a "town girl" in 2013 opposite Aadi and Nisha Agarwal in Sukumarudu.

Filmography

Films

See also
Nisha Agarwal
Sukumarudu

References

External links
 
 

Indian child actresses
21st-century Indian actresses
1989 births
Living people
Actresses from Mumbai
Actresses in Hindi cinema
Child actresses in Hindi cinema